Chromium silicide may refer to the following chemical compounds:
Trichromium silicide, Cr3Si 
Cr5Si3 
Chromium(IV) silicide, CrSi
Chromium(II) silicide, CrSi2